Ctenochelys is an extinct genus of marine turtle (Cryptodira, Pancheloniidae), which existed during the Cretaceous period, and lived in the shallow waters of the Western Interior Seaway. Its fossils have been found in the Ripley Formation and Mooreville Chalk of central Alabama, United States. It was first named by C.H. Sternberg in 1904,  and contains two species, C. stenoporus and C. acris.

Species

Ctenochelys stenoporus is the type species. It was originally thought to be a species of Toxochelys; T. bauri, until Sternberg declared it a separate genus. The two genera are similar in carapaces.
Ctenochelys acris was first named by Zangerl in 1953 and is now thought to be one of the earliest ancestors of modern cheloniids.

References

External links
Paleobiology Database
Big Brook Sea Turtle Page
St. Catherine's Island Sea Turtle Conservation Program: Life History: Geologic History of Sea Turtles
www.paleofile.com - Alphabetical list, Section C

Late Cretaceous turtles of North America
Cryptodira
Prehistoric turtle genera
Extinct turtles